Aiken Winter Colony Historic District III, located in Aiken, South Carolina. It has 42 properties, most of which were seasonal residences. The pleasing district varies from small cottages to large estates. Architectural styles include Queen Anne, Victorian, Colonial Revival, and Classical Revival, among others. The district also includes the Aiken Preparatory School.  Aiken Winter Colony Historic District III was listed in the National Register of Historic Places on November 27, 1984.

References

Historic districts in Aiken County, South Carolina
National Register of Historic Places in Aiken County, South Carolina
Queen Anne architecture in South Carolina
Shingle Style architecture in South Carolina
Historic districts on the National Register of Historic Places in South Carolina
Buildings and structures in Aiken, South Carolina